Sándor Garay (4 February 1920 – 7 February 2006) was a Hungarian middle-distance runner. He competed in the 1500 metres at the 1948 Summer Olympics and the 1952 Summer Olympics.

References

1920 births
2006 deaths
Athletes (track and field) at the 1948 Summer Olympics
Athletes (track and field) at the 1952 Summer Olympics
Hungarian male middle-distance runners
Olympic athletes of Hungary
Place of birth missing
20th-century Hungarian people